Hytche Athletic Center is a 5,500-seat multi-purpose arena in Princess Anne, Maryland. It is home to the University of Maryland Eastern Shore Hawks men's and women's basketball teams and women's volleyball team. It replaced J. Millard Tawes Gymnasium as the home of UMES basketball upon its opening in 2000.

See also
 List of NCAA Division I basketball arenas

References

College basketball venues in the United States
College volleyball venues in the United States
Sports venues in Maryland
Indoor arenas in Maryland
Maryland Eastern Shore Hawks men's basketball